The black-banded fruit dove (Ptilinopus alligator) is a large (38–44 cm in length, 450-570 g in weight) pigeon with white head, neck and upper breast; black back and upperwing grading to grey on rump; black tail with broad grey terminal band; underparts grey, demarcated from white head and neck by broad black band.

Distribution
The species is endemic to Australia, where it is restricted to the western edge of the Arnhem Land escarpment.

Habitat
Patches of monsoonal rainforest.

Food
Fruit from forest trees, especially figs.

Nesting
Lays single egg on open platform of sticks in a forest tree.

References

black-banded fruit dove
Birds of the Northern Territory
Endemic birds of Australia
black-banded fruit dove